The 2019 Men's under-19 World Floorball Championships were the tenth world championships in men's under-19 floorball. The tournament took place from May 8–12, 2019 in Halifax, Canada, and it was the first men's under-19 world championships played outside of Europe.

Qualification 
All teams in the A-Division qualified directly to the 2019 U-19 WFC based on the results of the 2017 Men's under-19 World Floorball Championships.

Venues

Tournament groups

Preliminary round

Group A

All times are local (UTC -3).

Group B

All times are local (UTC -3).

Placement round

Seventh place game

Fifth place game

Final round

Semifinals

Bronze medal game

Gold medal game

Final standings

Norway was relegated to the C and D groups at the 2021 Men's U-19 World Floorball Championships.

See also 
 2019 Men's under-19 World Floorball Championships B-Division

References

External links
 Official Website

Floorball World Championships
2019 in floorball
International floorball competitions hosted by Canada